Kırkağaç station is a railway station in Kırkağaç, Turkey. Located on the northeast periphery of the town, the station consists of one side platform and one island platform servicing two tracks, as well as a small freight depot. TCDD Taşımacılık operates four daily trains that stop at the station: the İzmir Blue Train, the Karesi Express, the 6th of September Express and the 17th of September Express.

The station was opened in 1890, by the Smyrna Cassaba Railway.

References

External links
Station information
Station timetable

Railway stations in Manisa Province
Railway stations opened in 1890
1890 establishments in the Ottoman Empire